Högsjö is a parish in Ångermanland in Sweden. It contains Högsjö new church (Högsjö nya kyrka) and Högsjö old church (Högsjö gamla kyrka). In 1971 the parish became part of Härnösand Municipality.

Västernorrland County
Diocese of Härnösand